Francesco Antonio Biondo, O.F.M. Conv. (died 21 December 1643) was a Roman Catholic prelate who served as Bishop of Ortona a Mare e Campli (1640–1643) and Bishop of Capri (1637–1640).

Biography
Francesco Antonio Biondo was ordained a priest in the Order of Friars Minor Conventual.
On 14 December 1637, he was appointed during the papacy of Pope Urban VIII as Bishop of Capri. On 3 January 1638, he was consecrated bishop by Marcello Lante della Rovere, Cardinal-Bishop of Frascati, with Francesco Maria Abbiati, Bishop of Bobbio, and Pomponio Vetuli, Bishop of Città Ducale, serving as co-consecrators. On 3 December 1640, he was appointed during the papacy of Pope Urban VIII as Bishop of Ortona a Mare e Campli. He served as Bishop of Ortona a Mare e Campli until his death on 21 December 1643.

See also 
Catholic Church in Italy

References

External links and additional sources
 (for Chronology of Bishops) 
 (for Chronology of Bishops) 
 (for Chronology of Bishops) 
 (for Chronology of Bishops)  

17th-century Italian Roman Catholic bishops
Bishops appointed by Pope Urban VIII
1643 deaths
Conventual Franciscan bishops